The Taeduk Radio Astronomy Observatory, or TRAO is an astronomical observatory owned and operated by  Korea Astronomy and Space Science Institute.  It is located in the science town of Taeduk, part of Daejeon, South Korea.

History
Founded in 1986, it is with a run through a cooperative agreement with the Ministry of Science and Technology of South Korea.

Equipment
14 meter radio telescope

External links
TRAO webpage
KASI webpage

Astronomical observatories in South Korea
Radio observatories